In algebraic geometry, the h topology is a Grothendieck topology introduced by Vladimir Voevodsky to study the homology of schemes.  It combines several good properties possessed by its related "sub"topologies, such as the qfh and cdh topologies. It has subsequently been used by Beilinson to study p-adic Hodge theory, in Bhatt and Scholze's work on projectivity of the affine Grassmanian, Huber and Jörder's study of differential forms, etc.

Definition 
Voevodsky defined the h topology to be the topology associated to finite families  of morphisms of finite type such that  is a universal topological epimorphism (i.e., a set of points in the target is an open subset if and only if its preimage is open, and any base change also has this property). Voevodsky worked with this topology exclusively on categories  of schemes of finite type over a Noetherian base scheme S.

Bhatt-Scholze define the h topology on the category  of schemes of finite presentation over a qcqs base scheme  to be generated by -covers of finite presentation. They show (generalising results of Voevodsky) that the h topology is generated by: 

 fppf-coverings, and
 families of the form  where
  is a proper morphism of finite presentation, 
  is a closed immersion of finite presentation, and 

Note that  is allowed in an abstract blowup, in which case Z is a nilimmersion of finite presentation.

Examples 
The h-topology is not subcanonical, so representable presheaves are almost never h-sheaves. However, the h-sheafification of representable sheaves are interesting and useful objects; while presheaves of relative cycles are not representable, their associated h-sheaves are representable in the sense that there exists a disjoint union of quasi-projective schemes whose h-sheafifications agree with these h-sheaves of relative cycles.

Any h-sheaf in positive characteristic satisfies  where we interpret  as the colimit  over the Frobenii (if the Frobenius is of finite presentation, and if not, use an analogous colimit consisting of morphisms of finite presentation). So the structure sheaf "is an h-sheaf on the category of perfect schemes" (although this sentence doesn't really make sense mathematically since morphisms between perfect schemes are almost never of finite presentation). In characteristic zero similar results hold with perfection replaced by semi-normalisation.

Huber-Jörder study the h-sheafification  of the presheaf  of Kähler differentials on categories of schemes of finite type over a characteristic zero base field . They show that if X is smooth, then , and for various nice non-smooth X, the sheaf  recovers objects such as reflexive differentials and torsion-free differentials.

By the Nullstellensatz, a morphism of finite presentation  towards the spectrum of a field  admits a section up to finite extension. That is, there exists a finite field extension  and a factorisation . Consequently, for any presheaf  and field  we have  where , resp. , denotes the h-sheafification, resp. etale sheafification.

Properties 

As mentioned above, in positive characteristic, any h-sheaf satisfies . In characteristic zero, we have  where  is the semi-normalisation (the scheme with the same underlying topological space, but the structure sheaf is replaced with its termwise seminormalisation).

Since the h-topology is finer than the Zariski topology, every scheme admits an h-covering by affine schemes.

Using abstract blowups and Noetherian induction, if  is a field admitting resolution of singularities (e.g., a characteristic zero field) then any scheme of finite type over  admits an h-covering by smooth -schemes. More generally, in any situation where de Jong's theorem on alterations is valid we can find h-coverings by regular schemes.

Since finite morphisms are h-coverings, algebraic correspondences are finite sums of morphisms.

cdh topology 

The cdh topology on the category  of schemes of finite presentation over a qcqs base scheme  is generated by:

 Nisnevich coverings, and
 families of the form  where
  is a proper morphism of finite presentation, 
  is a closed immersion of finite presentation, and 

The cd stands for completely decomposed (in the same sense it is used for the Nisnevich topology). As mentioned in the examples section, over a field admitting resolution of singularities, any variety admits a cdh-covering by smooth varieties. This topology is heavily used in the study of Voevodsky motives with integral coefficients (with rational coefficients the h-topology together with de Jong alterations is used).

Since the Frobenius is not a cdh-covering, the cdh-topology is also a useful replacement for the h-topology in the study of differentials in positive characteristic. 

Rather confusingly, there are completely decomposed h-coverings, which are not cdh-coverings, for example the completely decomposed family of flat morphisms .

Relation to v-topology and arc-topology

In other words, 

However, we could define an h-analogue of the fpqc topology by saying that an hqc-covering is a family  such that for each affine open  there exists a finite set K, a map  and affine opens  such that  is universally submersive (with no finiteness conditions). Then every v-covering is an hqc-covering.

Indeed, any subtrusive morphism is submersive (this is an easy exercise using ).

By a theorem of Rydh, for a map  of qcqs schemes with  Noetherian,  is a v-cover if and only if it is an arc-cover (for the statement in this form see ). That is, in the Noetherian setting everything said above for the v-topology is valid for the arc-topology.

Notes

References 
 Suslin, A., and Voevodsky, V., Relative cycles and Chow sheaves, April 1994, .

 
 

Algebraic geometry